Ghaffar Khan (born 1 April 1940) is a Pakistani former cricketer. He played 29 first-class cricket matches for several domestic sides in Pakistan between 1954 and 1984.

See also
 List of Pakistan Automobiles Corporation cricketers

References

External links
 

1940 births
Living people
Pakistani cricketers
Industrial Development Bank of Pakistan cricketers
Karachi Whites cricketers
Pakistan Automobiles Corporation cricketers
Pakistan Universities cricketers
People from Shimla